Melling railway station is the terminal station on the single track Melling Line  in Lower Hutt, New Zealand. The single platform station serves the suburb of Melling. The station is served by Metlink's electric multiple unit trains.

History  
The station used to be on the Hutt Valley Line section of the Wairarapa Line until 1 March 1954, when the Melling-Belmont section of the line on the western side of the Hutt Valley was closed and the through line to Upper Hutt and the Wairarapa rerouted through the centre of the valley. The truncated line to Melling was then electrified. The new station erected at the same time was about 100m closer to Wellington to avoid a level crossing at the Melling Link Road over the Hutt River.

In the 19th century, the line from Wellington to the Hutt was opened on 14 April 1874. The line past Melling to Silverstream was opened on December 1875.

The original Melling station opened on 26 May 1908. Melling was one of several stations and sidings opened in 1908 on the Hutt Valley section of line, along with Gosse and Co's Siding, Pitcaithly's railway station, the Belmont Quarry Co's Siding (not to be confused with the Belmont railway station), and the Silverstream Bridge railway station.

The station building today contains a ticket office and a coffee shop. The building was closed without notice on 18 December 2013 for asbestos removal, reopening on 18 February 2014.

Future 
The Melling Station will be moved under the three 2018 NZTA options for replacing the Melling road bridge. The proposed Melling Interchange also involves flood protection work, and will be completed by 2026 (in 2019 the project had been put "on hold").

Incidents 
Since the introduction of the Matangi EMUs in 2010, two have crashed into the stop block at the north end of the platform.  In the first incident, on 15 April 2013, nine passengers and 2 crew were aboard the 7:50am train that hit the stop block in a low-speed collision.  No serious injuries were reported and the line reopened the same day.

A year later on 27 May 2014 the 8:09am train crashed into and mounted the stop block.  Ten passengers were aboard, with one receiving minor injuries and another hospitalised for shock.  Services resumed two days later.

Services 
The following Metlink bus routes serve Melling station:

References

External links
 Passenger service timetables from Metlink and Tranz Metro.

Rail transport in Wellington
Railway stations in New Zealand
Railway stations opened in 1908
Buildings and structures in Lower Hutt
1908 establishments in New Zealand